Gehl is a surname. Notable people with the surname include:

Edward J. Gehl (1890–1956), American jurist
Gunnar Gehl (born 2001), American singer-songwriter
Jan Gehl (born 1936), Danish architect and urban designer
Julius Gehl (1869–1945), German politician
Katherine Gehl (born 1966), American businesswoman and published author

See also
Gehl Architects, a Danish urban research and design consulting firm
Gehl Company, a defunct American manufacturing company